Blair is an unincorporated community on the Shenandoah River in Jefferson County, West Virginia, United States. Blair lies along County Route 23.

References

Unincorporated communities in Jefferson County, West Virginia
Unincorporated communities in West Virginia